Glipa afrirozui is a species of beetle in the genus Glipa. It was described in 1949.

References

afrirozui
Beetles described in 1949